Hopewell is a settlement in Westmoreland Parish, Jamaica.

References

Populated places in Westmoreland Parish